Journal of Economic Surveys is a peer-reviewed academic journal published by John Wiley & Sons. The journal was established in 1987. The journal covers developments in economics in areas such as econometrics, economic history and business economics. Specific topics include business, finance, banking, regulation and exchanges.  

According to the Journal Citation Reports, the journal has a 2020 impact factor of 4.237, ranking it 56 out of 378 journals in the category "Economics".

The Journal of Economic Surveys is also rated as an 'A' class journal in the Australian Business Deans Council Journal List.

References

External links 
 

Wiley-Blackwell academic journals
English-language journals
Publications established in 1987
Bimonthly journals
Economics journals